Horsforth is a town and civil parish in the City of Leeds, West Yorkshire, England, five miles north-west of Leeds city centre. Historically a village within the West Riding of Yorkshire, it had a population of 18,895 at the 2011 Census. It became part of the City of Leeds metropolitan borough in 1974. In 1999, a civil parish was created for the area, and the parish council voted to rename itself a town council. The area is within the Horsforth ward of Leeds City Council, which also includes the southern part of Rawdon.

History

Horsforth was recorded in the Domesday Book of 1086 as Horseford, Horseforde, Hoseforde; but late-ninth-century coins with the legend ORSNA FORD and OHSNA FORD may have come from Horsforth. The name derives from Old English hors or, to judge from the coins, *horsa ('horse') in the genitive plural form horsa/horsna + ford 'ford', thus meaning 'horses' ford'. This refers to a river crossing on the River Aire (possibly at Newlay), that was subsequently used to transport woollen goods to and from Pudsey, Shipley and Bradford. The original ford was situated off Calverley Lane, but was replaced by a stone footbridge at the turn of the 19th century.

The three unnamed Saxon thegns that held the land at the Conquest gave way to the king who granted it to lesser Norman nobles, but not long after most of the village came under the control of Kirkstall Abbey, a Cistercian house founded in 1152 on the bank of the River Aire downstream of Horsforth.

After the Dissolution of the Monasteries in 1539, Horsforth was partitioned and sold to five families, one of them – the Stanhopes – achieved supremacy and controlled the village for the next 300 years. The estate record of the Stanhopes is regarded as one of the most extensive and important collections of its kind, complementing the extensive medieval record associated with Kirkstall Abbey.

Until the mid 19th century, Horsforth was an agricultural community but it expanded rapidly with the growth of the nearby industrial centre of Leeds. A tannery business was founded at Woodside in about 1820 by the Watson family. It was on the eastern edge of their small farm, and memorialised by Tanhouse Hill Lane. The business became a soap manufacturer and moved to Whitehall Road in Leeds in 1861 and under the chairmanship of Joseph Watson junior, created Baron Manton in 1922, as Joseph Watson & Sons Ltd, became the largest soap supplier to the northeast of England, second in size nationally only to Lever Brothers. Industrially, Horsforth has a history of producing high-quality stone from its quarries. Not only did it supply Kirkstall Abbey with building materials and millstones in the medieval period, it provided the stone for Scarborough's seafront and sent sandstone from Golden Bank Quarry as far afield as Egypt. Situated on Horsforth Beck (Oil Mill Beck) were mills serving the textile trade.

Between 1861 and 1862, there was an outbreak of typhoid.

Horsforth was historically a township in the parish of Guiseley. It became a separate civil parish in 1866. In the late-19th century it achieved note as the village with the largest population in England. Railways, turnpike roads, tramways and the nearby canal made it a focus for almost all forms of public and commercial transport and it became a dormitory suburb of Leeds. The civil parish became Horsforth Urban District in 1894. The parish and urban district were abolished in 1974 and merged into the new City of Leeds metropolitan district. In 1999 Horsforth became a civil parish and a parish council was created, which exercised its right to declare Horsforth a town.

Horsforth Village Museum has collections and displays illustrating aspects of life set against the backdrop of the changing role of the village.

During the Second World War the £241,000 required to build the corvette HMS Aubrietia was raised entirely by the people of Horsforth. In 2000 the US President Bill Clinton acknowledged Horsforth's contribution to the war effort in a letter sent to MP Paul Truswell. The letter is in the museum.

In October 2020 Horsforth was named the most musical village in Britain as it was revealed that 22 home-grown acts were in the running for the charts with their latest singles.

Transport

Rail

Horsforth railway station is on the Harrogate line between Harrogate and Leeds. The station is just outside the Horsforth parish boundary, on the Cookridge side of Moseley Beck.

Newlay station, which was built by the Midland Railway, was renamed Newlay & Horsforth station in 1889. It was situated south of the River Aire and was accessible from Horsforth on Pollard Lane which connects Horsforth to Bramley. The station on the Airedale line was renamed Newlay station in 1961. It closed on 22 March 1965, along with other stations on the Airedale line: Armley Canal Road, Kirkstall, Calverley & Rodley and Apperley Bridge.

Kirkstall Forge railway station is also located around two miles from Horsforth station. Kirkstall Forge railway station is a suburban station serving the Kirkstall area of Leeds, West Yorkshire, England. It is on the Leeds to Bradford Line between Leeds City and Shipley and was opened on 19 June 2016, near the site of an earlier station with the same name.

Bus
The town is served by several bus routes:
 8 – Pudsey to Cross Gates via Horsforth
 9 – Seacroft to Holt Park via Rothwell Rodley and Pudsey evenings and Sundays
 19A- Yeadon to East Garforth via Horsforth, Cookridge, Headlingley, Burley, Leeds city centre & Halton
 27 (formerly 97) – Leeds city centre to Guiseley via Headingley, Horsforth & Yeadon
 31, 32 – Horsforth Town Circular
 33, 34 – Leeds city centre to Guiseley/Otley via Kirkstall, New Road Side, Guiseley & Menston
 50, 50A – Horsforth (The Green) to Seacroft via Burley city centre & Harehills
 A1 – Leeds to Otley via New Road Side, Leeds Bradford Airport

Airport
The nearest airport is Leeds Bradford Airport, in neighbouring Yeadon approximately 2.6 miles away.

Education

Leeds Trinity University, formerly Leeds Trinity University College, is an independent university after a period as an accredited college of the University of Leeds. The residential campus is located off Brownberrie Lane, Horsforth.

The further education college Leeds City College has a former site in Horsforth which was called the Horsforth Campus. It was previously part of Park Lane College.

The main secondary school is Horsforth School. Horsforth's state sector primary schools are West End Lane Primary School, St Margaret's Primary School, Newlaithes Primary School, Westbrook Lane Primary School, Broadgate Lane Primary School, St Mary's Catholic Primary School and Featherbank Primary School.

Featherbank School opened in 1911 as a primary school, replacing the Grove Day School. The school's infant department was moved to the Grove Methodist Church on Stanhope Drive in 1933, but in 1960 transferred to the Featherbank School annexe. In 1972 Featherbank juniors (7–11 years) were allocated places at the newly built Newlaithes Junior School, at which point Featherbank became purely an infants' school (4–7 years). In September 2011 Featherbank reverted to a full primary school.

There is a private primary school, The Froebelian School.

Architecture

Horsforth has a large percentage of sandstone buildings sourced from local quarries, more than any other part of Leeds. A draft design statement was produced in 2010, which summarises much of the architectural and historical character.

Churches

The main churches in Horsforth are;
Lister Hill Baptist Church
Cragg Hill Baptist Church
St Margaret's Church of England
St James Woodside Church of England
Kingdom Hall of Jehovah's Witnesses
Central Methodist Church, Town Street
Grove Methodist Church
Woodside Methodist Church
Willow Green Christian Fellowship Pentecostal
St Mary's Roman Catholic Church
Leeds Trinity University campus chapel
Comboni Missionaries, Brownberrie Lane
Emmanuel Baptist Church
Mosaic Church

Scout and Guide hut

The Scout and Guide hut on New Road Side was requisitioned during the Second World War as an emergency mortuary for the factories based around what is now Leeds Bradford Airport (Yeadon Aerodrome at the time), but it was never needed. Before being purchased by the scouts and guides, the building was used as a cafe, a popular stop-off on the way out to Otley, Ilkey and the Dales.

Sports clubs and facilities

AFC Horsforth; Based at The Old Ball
AFC Horsforth Junior Club; Trinity and All Saints College.
Yarnbury Rugby Club
Horsforth Saints FC
Horsforth St Margaret's AFC
Horsforth Cricket Club
Horsforth Hall Park Cricket Club
Horsforth Harriers running club
Horsforth Fellandale running club
Horsforth Golf Club
Old Ball Football Pitches (Home of Horsforth St Margaret's FC)
Cragg Hill Football Pitches (Home of Horsforth St Margaret's FC and AFC Horsforth Reserves)
The Rec football pitch (Home of Horsforth Ringway)
Horsforth School Astroturf (Owned by Horsforth School)
Horsforth School Football and Rugby Pitches (Owned by Horsforth School and Home of AFC Horsforth Firsts)
Horsforth Ladies Hockey Club
West Yorkshire Wolves Junior Rugby League Club
Horsforth Tennis Club
LS18 Rocks Music School

Nightlife
Given its size, Horsforth has a relatively high number of bars and pubs of varying types from traditional pubs going back to the 17th century to more modern café bars and lounges. Horsforth Town Street has the highest concentration of these with several bars and pubs within a short distance of each other. Other popular night life areas include Station Road and New Road Side.

Notable people

Although originally from London, in the 1970s the former leader of the Labour Party Ed Miliband attended Featherbank Primary School, and his brother David Miliband attended Newlaithes Primary School, when their father Ralph Miliband was a professor at the University of Leeds
The footballer James Milner who attended Horsforth School and used to play for Leeds United, Newcastle United, Aston Villa and Manchester City. He currently plays for Liverpool and is an English International Footballer.
The actors Matthew Lewis (Neville Longbottom in the Harry Potter film series), Patric Knowles and Frazer Hines
The keyboard player Nick Baines, from the Kaiser Chiefs
The singer Marc Almond, who was educated at Featherbank Primary School
David Oxtoby, artist
Actor Malcolm McDowell, famous for his film roles including If...., A Clockwork Orange and O Lucky Man!.
Alistair and Jonny Brownlee (triathlon)
Paralympic gold medallist David Stone
Olympic cycling bronze medallist Jonny Clay
Sean Conlon who was in the boyband Five, grew up in Horsforth and attended St Mary's RC Primary School.
BTCC racing driver Sam Tordoff
Kathryn Apanowicz, a British actress notable for appearing in EastEnders.
Stanley Metcalfe (1932–2017), first-class cricketer
Frank Kershaw (1879–1959), first-class cricketer

Gallery

See also
Listed buildings in Horsforth

References

External links

 Horsforth Town council
 Horsforth Today Online Newspaper
 YEP Horsforth Today Community Website
 Horsforth Community website
 
 Lister Hill Baptist Church

 
Places in Leeds
Towns in West Yorkshire
Civil parishes in West Yorkshire